IDATE DigiWorld (formerly the Institut de l'audiovisuel et des télécommunications en Europe) is one of Europe’s think tanks on the digital economy whose aim is to assist members and clients in the media, internet and telecommunications sectors in their decision-making.

IDATE DigiWorld has been engaged in three activities since 1977.

History 
1977: IDATE founded by François Schoeller
1978: First IDATE International Conference
1986: Company name/acronym changes from Institute for the development of telecommunications and the economy to Institute for audiovisual media and telecommunications in Europe (Institut de l’Audiovisuel et des Télécommunications en Europe)
1986: Creation of the IDATE Foundation devoted to collaborative work performed by Foundation members
1987: François-Henri de Virieu becomes Chairman of IDATE
1991: Inauguration of the new building, IDATE’s current HQ
1991: The Communications & Strategies journal replaces the "Bulletins de l’IDATE"
1992: Development of an international network of partners
1995: Launch of the first IDATE website
1997: Marc Tessier becomes Chairman of IDATE
1999: Francis Lorentz becomes Chairman of IDATE
2000: First edition of the "DigiWorld Yearbook" published
2006: "DigiWorld Summit" becomes the new brand of the 28th annual IDATE International Conference
2007:"IDATE Foundation" becomes the "DigiWorld Programme"
2008: 30th edition of the DigiWorld Summit, with "The Future of the Internet" as its central theme
2010: Launch of the DigiWorld application for iPad to coincide with the launch of the tablet’s first iteration
2011: François Barrault becomes Chairman of IDATE
2012: "DigiWorld Institute" brand replaces "DigiWorld Programme"

Activity

Research 
Reports and databases of digital markets and innovation.

Consulting 
Studies and consultancy, on behalf of industry and public authorities.

Think tank 
The international Think Tank, dedicated to the challenges of the digital economy.

Management Team 
François Barrault, President
Jacques Moulin, CEO
Pierre-Michel Attali, Digital Territories Business Unit Director
Christine Barre, Events & Communication Director
Mathieu Bec, Consultant, digital transformation
Vincent Bonneau, Innovation Business Unit Director
Isabelle Brugié, Administrative & Financial Director
Jean-Luc Lemmens, Media-Telecom Business Unit Director
Roland Montagne, Business development Director

Former managers:
 Gilles Fontaine, Deputy CEO
 Yves Gassot, CEO
 Jean-Dominique Séval, Deputy CEO

References 

Think tanks based in France
Advocacy groups in France